The 2019 Campbellfield factory fire was a major industrial fire that began in Campbellfield, a suburb of Melbourne, Victoria, Australia, on 5 April 2019. The fire was finally extinguished four days after it started.

The company which operated the property where the fire took place, Bradbury Industrial Services, collapsed in July 2019, leaving taxpayers to potentially foot a multimillion-dollar clean-up bill.  On 1 August 2019, the administrators for the company were given three months to clean up the site.

Background 
The fire occurred at a waste management factory owned by Bradbury Industrial Services on Thornycroft St at 6:40 am. Buildings and vehicles were turned into fireballs and chemical drums sent soaring high above the warehouse as the inferno raged for hours. A witness in a nearby suburb to the fire said he saw a "massive explosion that looked like a mushroom cloud". Two other fires had broken out in the facility previously.

Bradbury Industrial Services provides storage and disposal services for hazardous and industrial waste, and specialises in treating solvent and other waste from paint and related industries.

Fire 
Metropolitan Fire Brigade firefighters brought the blaze under control by midday on 5 April; however, the fire was not fully extinguished until four days later. About thirty people were believed to have escaped the building before the firefighters arrived. At least two factory workers were hospitalised as a result of severe burns from the fire, with one employee receiving an eye injury.

The fire was initially contained within four hours by 175 firefighters. Fire crews remain at the scene, using heat-detection devices to continually identify and dampen-down hotspots. The fire forced the closure of nearby schools and businesses. Some residents fled their homes to escape toxic fumes.

A number of schools and kindergartens in proximity to the fire were closed as of 7 April including:

 Dallas Brooks Community Primary School in Dallas
 Coolaroo South Primary School in Coolaroo
 Broadmeadows Primary School in Broadmeadows
 Hume Central Secondary College in Broadmeadows
 Meadows Primary School in Broadmeadows
 Hume Valley School in Dallas
 St Thomas More Primary School in Hadfield
 Ilim College in Broadmeadows
 Holy Child Primary School in Dallas
 St Dominic’s Primary School in Broadmeadows
 Corpus Christi School in Glenroy

Investigations 
Investigations into the cause of the fire were started on 9 April, involving police, fire investigators from the Melbourne Metropolitan Fire Brigade, WorkSafe Victoria, and the Victorian Coroner.
Initial speculations focused on the illegal or improper storage of flammable chemical waste.

The fire began less than one day after Victorian Environment Protection Authority authorities inspected the factory, and fifteen days after the factory had its license revoked for storing three times as much waste as it was permitted. The EPA's inspection on 4 April discovered 300,000 litres of chemicals inside.

EPA executive director Damian Wells said the factory contained "highly flammable materials".

The EPA has begun an independent review into its systems and processes for dealing with toxic waste.

References 

2019 in Australia
Fires in Australia
Industrial fires and explosions in Australia
2010s in Melbourne
2019 fires in Oceania